The Supreme Court of the Czech Republic is the court of highest appeal for almost all legal cases heard in the Czech Republic. As set forth in the Constitution of the Czech Republic, however, cases of constitutionality, administrative law and political jurisdiction are heard by other courts.

Along with the Supreme Administrative and Constitutional Court, the Supreme Court forms a triumvirate of courts at the summit of the Czech judiciary. It is situated on Burešova Street 20, Brno.

The Supreme Court sits in panels consisting of a Chairman and two judges or it sits in Grand Panels of the Divisions.

The Divisions analyse and evaluate legally effective decisions of lower courts.

The Criminal Division consists of the judges of the Supreme Court, who apply substantive and procedural criminal law.

The Civil and Commercial Division is responsible for ensuring uniformity and lawfulness in the decision-making of courts in civil proceedings. It does so in extraordinary appeal proceedings against decisions of courts of appeal and within its non-decision-making jurisdiction by providing standpoints.

The Grand Panel of the Division decides cases referred to it by divisions.

The Plenum discusses the Supreme Court's Rules of Procedure and adopts standpoints on the courts decision-making.

References

Government of the Czech Republic
Czech Republic, Supreme Court of
Law of the Czech Republic
Judiciary of the Czech Republic
1993 establishments in the Czech Republic
Courts and tribunals established in 1993